James Roosevelt "Rosy" Roosevelt (April 27, 1854 – May 7, 1927) was an American diplomat, heir, and the older half-brother of  Franklin Delano Roosevelt, the 32nd president of the United States.

Early life
James Roosevelt "Rosy" Roosevelt was born on April 27, 1854. He was the son of James Roosevelt I (1828–1900) and his first wife, Rebecca Brien Howland (1831–1876), who were second cousins. When his father died in 1900, the family's estate was split between Rosy and his half-brother, Franklin. Throughout his life he was considered "an aimless if charming member of New York society's sporting set."

Career
Roosevelt graduated with honors from Columbia College in 1877. President Grover Cleveland, who counted Rosy's father as a friend and supporter, appointed him first secretary of the United States legation in Vienna, Austria and as first secretary of the embassy in London, England.

Roosevelt was a trustee of the Cathedral of St. John the Divine and a close friend of Cardinal Patrick Joseph Hayes. He donated more than $250,000 to St. Francis Hospital in New York and also gave substantial funds to the parish of St. James Episcopal Church in Hyde Park, New York.

During World War I, he sold Liberty bonds and war savings stamps from an office he maintained in New York's Post Office Building.

Personal life
On November 18, 1878, Roosevelt married Helen Schermerhorn Astor (1855–1893), the second daughter of businessman William Backhouse Astor Jr. (1829–1892) and socialite Caroline Webster Schermerhorn (1830–1908).  Together, Roosevelt and Helen had two children:
 James Roosevelt "Tadd" Roosevelt Jr. (1879–1958), who married Sadie Messinger (c. 1880–1940)
 Helen Rebecca Roosevelt (1881–1962), who in 1904 married Theodore Douglas Robinson (1883–1934), the eldest nephew of President Theodore Roosevelt (1858–1919)

After his first wife's death in 1893, Roosevelt married Elizabeth Riley on August 7, 1914. On May 7, 1927, Roosevelt died at his Hyde Park home as a result of complications related to bronchitis and asthma, according to news reports at the time. His second wife died in 1948.

References
Notes

Sources
 Black, Conrad Franklin Delano Roosevelt: Champion of Freedom (2005)
 Miller, Nathan Theodore Roosevelt: A Life (1992)
 Moffat, R. Burnham The Barclays of New york: who they are and who they are not, – and some other Barclays (1904)

External links
 "Roosevelt family papers" on the FDR Library website
 "FDR Genealogy" on the FDR Library website
 
 "Helen Rebecca Roosevelt" on Ancestry.com

1854 births
1927 deaths
American diplomats
American people of Dutch descent
American people of English descent
Astor family
Livingston family
People from New York City
James
Columbia University alumni
Howland family